Ethlyn may refer to:

 Ethlyn T. Clough (1858–1936), American newspaper publisher, editor
 Ethlyn Smith (1940-2007), civil servant from the British Virgin Islands
 Ethlyn Tate (born 1966), Jamaican sprinter
 Ethlyn, Missouri, United States, an unincorporated community

Feminine given names